Events in the year 1991 in the Republic of India.

Incumbents
 President of India – R. Venkataraman
 Prime Minister of India – Chandra Shekhar Singh until 21 June, P. V. Narasimha Rao
 Chief Justice of India – 
 until 24 November – Ranganath Misra  
 25 November-12 December – Kamal Narain Singh
 starting 13 December – Madhukar Hiralal Kania

Governors
 Andhra Pradesh – Krishan Kant 
 Arunachal Pradesh – 
 until 16 March: Devi Das Thakur 
 16 March-25 March: Loknath Mishra
 starting 25 March: Surendranath Dwivedy
 Assam – Devi Das Thakur (until 17 March), Loknath Mishra (starting 17 March)
 Bihar – 
 until 13 February: Mohammad Saleem 
 14 February-18 March: B. Satya Narayan Reddy
 starting 18 March: Mohammad Shafi Qureshi
 Goa – Khurshed Alam Khan (until 17 March), Bhanu Prakash Singh (starting 18 March)
 Gujarat – Sarup Singh
 Haryana – Dhanik Lal Mandal 
 Himachal Pradesh – Virendra Verma 
 Jammu and Kashmir – Girish Chandra Saxena
 Karnataka – Bhanu Pratap Singh
 Kerala – B. Rachaiah
 Madhya Pradesh – M. A. Khan
 Maharashtra – C. Subramaniam
 Manipur – Chintamani Panigrahi 
 Meghalaya – Madhukar Dighe (starting 8 May)
 Mizoram – Swaraj Kaushal 
 Nagaland – M. M. Thomas 
 Odisha – Yagya Dutt Sharma 
 Punjab – Om Prakash Malhotra (until 7 August), Surendra Nath (starting 7 August)
 Rajasthan – Debi Prasad Chattopadhyaya (until 26 August), Sarup Singh (starting 26 August)
 Sikkim – Radhakrishna Hariram Tahiliani 
 Tamil Nadu – Surjit Singh Barnala (until 14 February), Bhishma Narain Singh (starting 14 February)
 Tripura – K. V. Raghunatha Reddy 
 Uttar Pradesh – B. Satya Narayan Reddy 
 West Bengal – Saiyid Nurul Hasan

Events

 National income - 6,622,605 million
 1 January - Minister of Civil Aviation Harmohan Dhawan declares Thiruvananthapuram Airport as International airport.
 6 January – The All India Federation of Anganwadi Workers and Helpers is founded in Udaipur.
 21 May – Assassination of Rajiv Gandhi: Former Prime Minister Rajiv Gandhi is assassinated by a Liberation Tigers of Tamil Eelam suicide bomber in Sriperumbudur near Chennai in Tamil Nadu during the election campaign.
 31 May – The Government of India constitutes the Company Law Board as an independent quasi-judicial body thus giving up direct control on matters of company law.
 15 June – When the general election results are all compiled, the Congress Party has won a plurality of votes.
 21 June – Indian National Congress leader P.V. Narasimha Rao becomes Prime Minister.
 24 June – J. Jayalalithaa is sworn in as chief minister of Tamil Nadu for the first time.
 24 July – The government of India announces its New Industrial Policy, marking the start of India's economic reforms.
 17 October – 1991 Rudrapur bombings by Sikh separatists, who exploded two bombs, during a Ramlila Hindu celebration in Rudrapur, Uttarakhand, killing 41 people.
 20 October – The 6.8  Uttarkashi earthquake shook northern India with a maximum Mercalli intensity of IX (Violent), killing 768–2,000 and injuring 1,383–1,800.
 11 December – Rapid Action Force established by Union Home Ministry.

laws were passed and liberalisation happened

Births
26 January – Vijay Shankar, cricketer.
 16 February – Mayank Agarwal, cricketer.
 24 March – Krunal Pandya, cricketer.
 7 May – Gaurav Chaudhary, Youtuber
29 June – D. Karthika Anagha, Carnatic classical vocalist.
31 July  Kiara Advani, actress.
 9 August – Hansika Motwani, actress.
 27 September – Amzad Ali, cricketer.
 16 October – Shardul Thakur, cricketer.
 18 October – Jaydev Unadkat, cricketer.
 26 October – Amala Paul, actress.
6 December – Karun Nair, Indian cricketer.

Deaths
 21 February – Nutan, Bollywood actress
15 May – Kalindi Charan Panigrahi, poet, novelist, story writer, dramatist and essayist (born 1901)
21 May – Rajiv Gandhi, prime minister (1984–1989), Bharat Ratna (1991) (born 1944)
24 October – Ismat Chughtai, writer (born 1915)

References

See also 
 Bollywood films of 1991

 
India
Years of the 20th century in India